Henricus (Harrie) Johannes Maria Sipman (born 1945) is a Dutch lichenologist. He specialises in tropical and subtropical lichens, and has authored or co-authored more than 250 scientific publications. He was the curator of the lichen herbarium at the Berlin Botanical Garden and Botanical Museum from 1983 until his retirement in 2010.

Life and career
Sipman was born in 1945 in Sittard, Netherlands. He attended Utrecht University, where he studied botany. Sipman was appointed to the Herbarium and the Institute for Systematic Botany from 1972 to 1982, where his focus was on lichenology and bryology. During this time, some of his research publications dealt with taxa from the lichen genera Cladonia and Stereocaulon, and on the Musci Anisothecium staphylinum, Campylopus and Ephemerum. His supervisor was Robbert Gradstein (nl). He earned his PhD in 1983 after defending a thesis on the family Megalosporaceae, later published as a monograph in the Bibliotheca Lichenologica series. Afterwards he started a long career as curator of lichens in the Berlin Botanical Garden and Botanical Museum. Frequent collaborators include André Aptroot, Teuvo Ahti, Paul Diederich, Mark Seaward, Emmanuël Sérusiaux, and Richard Harris. Many of his publications deal with lichen floras of tropical and subtropical countries such as Colombia, Costa Rica, Guiana, and New Guinea.

Recognition
A Festschrift was dedicated to his honour in 2009, on the occasion of his 64th birthday, and his impending retirement. The volume includes 29 peer-reviewed contributions of various aspects of lichenology written by 50 of his colleagues. It also has a biography, a list of his scientific publications, and a list of new taxa introduced by him (at the time of compilation, it was nine genera and 213 species).

Eponymy
Three genera are named after Sipman:
Heiomasia  (family Graphidaceae) – combines the letters Henricus Ioannes Marius Sipman 
Sipmania  (family Roccellaceae)
Sipmaniella  (family Megalosporaceae).

Many species have been named to honour Harrie Sipman. These eponyms include:
Leproloma sipmanianum ; Phacopsis falcispora var. sipmanii ; Xanthoparmelia sipmanii ; Opegrapha sipmanii ; Relicina sipmanii ; Rinodina sipmanii ; Sporopodiopsis sipmanii ; Pertusaria sipmanii ; Trichothelium sipmanii ; Bulbothrix sipmanii ; Parmotrema sipmanii ; Cladonia sipmanii ; Lecania sipmanii ; Diorygma sipmanii ; Enterographa sipmanii ; Imshaugia sipmanii ; Tricharia sipmanii ; Xanthoria sipmanii ; Bacidia sipmanii ; Buellia sipmanii ; Caloplaca sipmanii ; Chapsa sipmanii ; Herpothallon sipmanii ; Micarea sipmanii ; Pyrenula sipmanii ; Synarthothelium sipmanianum ; Zwackhiomyces sipmanii ; Lobariella sipmanii ; Remototrachyna sipmaniana ; Astrochapsa sipmanii ; Sclerococcum sipmanii ; Astrothelium sipmanii ; Endococcus sipmanii ; Pygmaeosphaera sipmaniana ; Rhizocarpon sipmanianum ; and Carbacanthographis sipmaniana .

Selected publications
A complete list of publications (up to 2008) is given by Aptroot in the 2009 Festschrift. Some of Sipman's work includes the following:

 

Sipman, H. J. M. 2005: Líquenes de los Páramos de Costa Rica. Pp. 242-360 in: M. Kappelle & S. Horn (Eds.), Páramos de Costa Rica. 786 pp.
Seaward, M.R.D., Sipman, H.J.M. & Sohrabi, M. 2008: A revised checklist of lichenized, lichenicolous and allied fungi for Iran. In: Türk, R., John, V. & Hauck, M. (eds). Facetten der Flechtenforschung. Festschrift zu Ehren von Volkmar Wirth. Sauteria 15: 459 –520.

See also
 :Category:Taxa named by Harrie Sipman

References

1945 births
Living people
20th-century Dutch scientists
21st-century Dutch scientists
Dutch lichenologists
Dutch taxonomists
Utrecht University alumni